Stine Knudsen (born 27 April 1992) is a retired Danish handball player who, last played for København Håndbold, until 2018.

References

1992 births
Living people
People from Fredericia Municipality
Danish female handball players
Sportspeople from the Region of Southern Denmark